Xylan alpha-1,2-glucuronosidase (1,2-alpha-glucuronidase, alpha-(1->2)-glucuronidase, xylan alpha-D-1,2-(4-O-methyl)glucuronohydrolase) is an enzyme with systematic name xylan 2-alpha-D-(4-O-methyl)glucuronohydrolase. This enzyme catalyses the following chemical reaction

 Hydrolysis of (1->2)-alpha-D-(4-O-methyl)glucuronosyl links in the main chain of hardwood xylans

References

External links 
 

EC 3.2.1